'Nicholas A. Price is an American visual artist who specializes in fine art film, photography, sculpture and public art. 

Price also writes poetry, children's short stories and adult fiction stories in the genres of crime thrillers and comedy.

"Cleared Hot" 

In 2009, the Library of Congress acquired "Cleared Hot", 60 large-format, black-and-white photographs of men and women in the U.S. Air Force, to fill a gap in the Library's visual collections related to the history of military aviation. The photos are available for viewing by researchers in the Library's Prints and Photographs Division."The 60 photographs create a valuable visual story for understanding the hard work and deep commitment of today’s military," said Helena Zinkham, acting chief of the Prints and Photographs Division. "This compelling photographic essay, created to honor the men and women of the Air Force, enriches the Library’s collections by providing a contemporary counterpart to our historic resources."

Fine Art Film Photography

Fine Art Photography Commissions 
 Cleared Hot
 Playground of The Gods 
 Trick Trunk
 Partnerships With Nature
 Dam Perspective (Hoover Dam)
 Dance In Focus/Anatomy of A Ballet
 Signs of Americana
 Portraits of America

Books for children 
 (2017) Timed to Perfection. New York: Demy Books. .
 (2017) The Lazy Hour. New York: Demy Books. .
 (2017) Mister Second Runs Out of Time. New York: Demy Books. .
 (2017) The Moon Has a Big Head. New York: Demy Books. .
 (2017) Lilys Curl. New York: Demy Books. .
 (2017) The Tapeworm. New York: Demy Books. .
 The Hideous Child. New York: Demy Books. .
 (2017) Hop on Board. New York: Demy Books.

Adult Fiction Books 
He also writes adult fiction books. His book Adventures in Trichology, is a biography of Norman Baker. His other published books are;
 (2017) Hated Men. New York: Bulldog Publications. .
 (2018) The Unexpected Warrior. New York: Bulldog Publications. .
 (2018) The Unexpected Knight. New York: Bulldog Publications. .
 (2018) The Unexpected Return. New York: Bulldog Publications.

Poetry 
 (2011) Bridges to Manhattan. New York: Tough Tribe Publishing. .
 (2011) Forgotten Holiday. New York: Tough Tribe Publishing. .
 (2011) An Elephant in My Front Yard. New York: Tough Tribe Publishing. .
 (2011) Thoughts of You. New York: Tough Tribe Publishing. .

Noted Commissions

References

External links 
 Nicholas A. Price on Artnet
 Library of Congress Acquires Nicholas Price Photographs of U.S. Air Force
 Honor Guard Photo in the Repository: Library of Congress Prints and Photographs Division Washington, D.C. 20540
 Backstage At The Ballet, Sarasota Magazine
 Aiming High
 Godland
 Playground of the gods
 Photographer’s acclaimed photographs of the Valley of Fire 
 Cleared Hot!
 Library of Congress exhibit, ‘Cleared Hot,' opens in Ocala
Photographer's pictures of Airmen now in Library of Congress
Courthouse display ready to come off the walls
SCULPTING DOWNTOWN
Nicholas A. Price Official Author Website

1962 births
Living people
American photographers
Fine art photographers